Jeffrey Barosh Sr. (December 13, 1954 in El Campo, Texas – December 12, 2008) was an American country music singer, known professionally as Jeff Chance. He was initially a member of the five-piece band "Texas Pride" which later became Chance recording one album for Mercury Records in 1985. As a solo artist he recorded four albums "Picture on the Wall" 1991 and "Walk Softly on the Bridges" 1992 for Mercury Records Nashville and "Back Again" 2008 and "Between the Sheets" 2013 for Music Master and charted five country singles  in the mid-1980s. The second album included backing vocals from Shania Twain.

Discography

Albums

Singles

Music videos

References

Victoria Advocate Obituaries
[ Jeff Chance biography] at Allmusic

1954 births
2008 deaths
American country fiddlers
American country singer-songwriters
Curb Records artists
Country musicians from Texas
20th-century American singers
Singer-songwriters from Texas
People from El Campo, Texas